Sunset Lake, sometimes called Lake Sunset, is a  freshwater lake located in west central Orlando, Florida. This teardrop-shaped lake is surrounded by a residential area. John Young Parkway borders the lake on part of its west side.

Fishing is a popular activity. There are no public swimming areas on the shore of this lake, and there are no public boat docks on the lake. One public park, Gilbert McQueen Park, is on the lake's southeast side. This park has only one sidewalk, which does not border Sunset Lake. The Take Me Fishing website provides no information on what types of fish are in this lake.

References

Lakes of Orange County, Florida
Lakes of Florida